"Run to You" is a song performed by American singer and actress Whitney Houston, released on June 21, 1993, by Arista Records as the fourth single from The Bodyguard: Original Soundtrack Album (1992). It was written by Jud Friedman and Allan Rich, and produced by David Foster. Originally intended to be a break-up song, it was approved by the production and stars. However, a month later, the director of The Bodyguard (Mick Jackson) called, saying he liked the song so much, but he'd rather have it to be a love song so the entire song was rewritten, except for the title.

All of the previous releases from The Bodyguard had been successes, landing in the top five. "Run to You" became a moderate hit, peaking at number 31 on the Billboard Hot 100. In the US, it spent six weeks inside the top 40, five of which were spent at the number 31 peak. Airplay and singles sales topped out at number 26 and 41, respectively. The single sales stalled at number 41 on the Hot 100 Singles Sales chart, most likely due to the fact its parent album, The Bodyguard, already was certified 8× platinum and nearing 9× platinum status quickly. Single sales were moderate because most consumers already owned the song by simply owning the album. On other Billboard charts, the song was moderately well received. On the Hot R&B/Hip-Hop Songs chart, it reached a peak position of number 31. The song also cracked the top 10 on the Hot Adult Contemporary Tracks chart, peaking at number 10. Internationally, it was not as well received, except in the UK and Ireland, peaking at number 15 and number nine, respectively.

"Run to You" and its soundtrack-mate "I Have Nothing" were nominated for a 1993 Academy Award for Best Original Song, but they lost to "A Whole New World" from Aladdin.

Critical reception
AllMusic editor Stephen Thomas Erlewine praised the song as a "first-rate urban pop song that skillfully captures Houston at her best." Larry Flick from Billboard described it as a "sparkling ballad" with "a plush, shiny arrangement". He also viewed it as a "dramatic fare" and "a truly effective and memorable performance." Troy J. Augusto from Cashbox commented, "Loyal, forever-suffering true love is again the theme as Houston uses her flair for the dynamic with impressive (again, par for her course) results. Wonderful arrangement and production from David Foster point to another smash." Alan Jones from Music Week deemed it as "a sweeping, melodic, if predictable, ballad", that "is sure to be lapped up." Randy Ross from The Network Forty noted it as "vintage Whitney". Editor Stephen Holden from The New York Times  described it as a "booming generic ballad to which Houston applies her typical stentorian delivery." Larry A. from USA Today praised the singing, calling it a "thrilling ballad, powered by an operatic coloratura alto."

Chart performance
Though "Run to You" is one of Houston's most recognized songs worldwide, the chart performance was not as successful as her previous hit singles' at the time of its release because its parent album, The Bodyguard soundtrack, had already sold 21 million copies globally at that point and most consumers had the song by simply owning the soundtrack. In the United States, "Run to You" debuted at number 83 and 76 on the Billboard Hot 100 and Hot R&B Singles charts, in the issue dated June 26, 1993, respectively. Three weeks later the single reached its peak position of number 31 on both the charts in the July 17, 1993, issue. On the Hot 100, the song spent six weeks inside the Top 40, five of which were stayed at its number 31 peak from July 17 to August 14, 1993. In addition, it peaked at number 41 and 26 on the component charts of the Hot 100, the Hot 100 Singles Sales and the Hot 100 Airplay, respectively. The song also peaked at number 10 on the Hot Adult Contemporary chart, becoming Houston's 17th Top 10 hit of the chart. In Canada, the song debuted at number 86 on the RPM 100 Hits Tracks chart, the issue dated July 10, 1993. The next week it leaped to number 34 on the chart and reached the Top 20 in its fourth week of release. On the August 28, 1993, issue, it reached its peak position of number 10 on the chart, becoming her 16th Top 10 hit in the country.

Internationally, "Run to You" was a moderate hit like in the US. In the United Kingdom, the song entered the UK Singles Chart at number 20, the week ending dated July 31, 1993. The following week it reached its peak position of number 15 on the chart. In Belgium, the song debuted at number 19 on the VRT Top 30 chart but the next week dropped to outside Top 30. In Ireland, it peaked at number nine on the Irish Singles Chart, spending four weeks in the chart. In other European countries, it failed to make the Top 40 and stayed only one or two weeks on the charts, peaking at number 33 in the Netherlands, number 47 in France, and 58 in Germany.

Music video
A music video was produced to promote the single, directed by Mitchell Sinoway. It features scenes from The Bodyguard intercut with scenes of an angelic Houston running on clouds.

Live performances
Houston has performed the song on select dates during her Bodyguard World Tour in 1993–1994. "Run to You" was performed at the November 5 and 7, 1993 shows at the Earls Court Exhibition Centre in London, England, at the August 14, 1994, show at the San Jose Arena in San Jose, California and at the September 16, 27 and 28, 1994 shows at Radio City Music Hall in New York City. In November 2017, Legacy issued the 25th anniversary album, I Wish You Love: More from The Bodyguard, a live performance of "Run To You" is included.

Track listings and formats

 US CD single
 "Run to You" – 4:22
 "After We Make Love" – 5:07

 US 12-inch single
A1. "Run to You" – 4:22 
B1. "After We Make Love" – 5:07
B2. "For the Love of You – 5:29UK CD1 "Run to You" – 4:22
 "After We Make Love" – 5:07
 "For the Love of You – 5:28UK CD2' "Run to You" – 4:22
 "I Belong to You" – 5:31
 "Greatest Love of All" – 5:29

Personnel
 Whitney Houston – vocals
 David Foster – producer, arrangement, string arrangement, bass
 Jud Friedman – arrangement, keyboards
 William Ross – string arrangement
 John Robinson – drums
 Dean Parks – acoustic guitar
 Simon Franglen – Synclavier and synth programming
 Dave Reitzas – recording engineer
 Mick Guzauski – mixing engineer

Charts

Weekly charts

Year-end charts

Certifications

Release history

Cover versions
 Natalie Cole performed a medley of "Run to You" and "I Have Nothing" at the 1993 Academy Awards. Houston was to perform both songs which was nominated for Best Original Song, but unable to attend the ceremony. Cole was joined on stage with producer David Foster playing piano.
 Christina Aguilera sang this song live in 2001 as a tribute to Whitney Houston at the 1st Annual BET Awards. The tribute was a result of Houston receiving the Lifetime Achievement Award. When receiving the award, Houston complimented Aguilera's version, calling it the best version beside her own. Aguilera would later be asked to perform the song in a tribute to Houston and The Bodyguard soundtrack, alongside "I Will Always Love You", "I Have Nothing", and "I'm Every Woman" at the American Music Awards of 2017.
 Smokie Norful recorded his version on a 2006 album Life Changing.
 Leanne Mitchell, winner of The Voice UK, released a version of the song in July 2012. She performed the song twice on the TV show.
 Cass Phang covered this song in Cantonese.
 Heather Headley covered this song on her 2012 album Only One in the World, released just before the opening of the West End production of the musical The Bodyguard'', in which Headley sings "Run to You" and plays the equivalent of Houston's role from the film.
 Glennis Grace sang this song as a tribute to Whitney Houston and became a YouTube sensation after Nicki Minaj tweeted about Glennis' performance.

References

External links
 Run to You at Discogs
 Run to You - Whitney Houston Official site

Whitney Houston songs
1993 singles
1990s ballads
Song recordings produced by David Foster
Pop ballads
Contemporary R&B ballads
Songs written for films
1991 songs
1992 songs
Songs written by Jud Friedman
Arista Records singles